The 2023 Queensland Cup season is the 28th season of Queensland's top-level statewide rugby league competition run by the Queensland Rugby League. The competition, known as the Hostplus Cup due to sponsorship, features 15 teams playing a 26-week long season (including finals) from March to September.

Teams 
In 2023, the line-up of teams changed for the first time in 8 years with the addition of the Western Clydesdales. The North Queensland Cowboys changed their affiliation agreement, with the Cowboys sending all NRL contracted players not selected in their weekly squad to just the Townsville Blackhawks.

Regular season 
 Fixtures

The Round 1 match between Redcliffe Dolphins and Brisbane Tigers was abandoned after four minutes due to torrential rain. The match will not be replayed. The final result is a 0-0 draw with each team awarded a point for ladder purposes.

Ladder

See also 

 Queensland Cup
 Queensland Rugby League

References

2023 in Australian rugby league
Queensland Cup